The CIA is the Central Intelligence Agency, the main civilian foreign intelligence agency of the United States government.

CIA may also refer to:

Airports
 Ciampino–G. B. Pastine International Airport or Rome Ciampino Airport. Italy, IATA code
 Chennai International Airport
 Coimbatore International Airport

Art, entertainment, and media
 C.I.A. (band), a band 
 Comrade in America, a 2017 film

Education
 Cleveland Institute of Art, Ohio, US
 The Art Institute of Colorado, a former institution in Denver, US
 The Culinary Institute of America, Hyde Park, New York, US

Organizations
 California Institute of Abnormalarts, a nightclub in North Hollywood, US
 CAN in Automation, Controller Area Network organization
 Canadian Institute of Actuaries
 Chemical Industries Association, UK
 Creators of Intense Art, a computer art organization

Technology
 CIA triad (confidentiality, integrity and availability) of information security
 MOS Technology CIA, an integrated circuit

Other uses
Cardiff International Arena, Cardiff
 Certified Internal Auditor, a professional designation from the Institute of Internal Auditors

See also

 Chia (disambiguation)
 Sia (disambiguation)